Carles is a Catalan given name of Germanic origin that is a form of Charles. It is also a surname. Notable people with this name include the following:

Given name

Carles Aleñá (born 1998), Spanish footballer
Carles Benavent (born 1954), Spanish flamenco and jazz bassist
Carles Blasi Vidal (born 1964), Andorran politician
Carles Boix (born 1962), Spanish political scientist
Carles Buïgas (1898–1979), Spanish architect, engineer, inventor and author
Carles Busquets (born 1967), Spanish footballer
Carles Campuzano (born 1964), Spanish politician
Carles Canut (1944–2018), Spanish actor
Carles Casagemas (1880–1901), Spanish painter and poet
Carles Castillejo (born 1978), Spanish long-distance athlete
Carles Castillo (born 1975), Spanish politician
Carles Comamala (1887–1976), Spanish orthopedic surgeon and footballer
Carles Congost (born 1970), Spanish artist
Carles Coto (born 1988), Spanish footballer
Carles Cuadrat (born 1968), Spanish footballer, coach and manager 
Carles Delclaux Is (born 1951), Spanish textile artist
Carles Fages de Climent (1902–1968), Spanish writer, poet and journalist
Carles Font-Rossell (born 1967), Andorran diplomat and ambassador
Carles Francino (born 1958), Spanish journalist
Carles Gil (born 1992), Spanish footballer
Carles Poch Gradin (born 1982), Spanish tennis player
Carles Juanmartí (born 1978), Spanish canoeist 
Carles Lalueza-Fox (born 1965), Spanish biologist
Carles Lerín (born 1962), Swiss-born Spanish modern pentathlete
Carles Magraner, Spanish musician
Carles Marco (born 1974), Spanish basketball player
Carles Marc Martínez Embuena (born 1988), Spanish footballer 
Carles Mas (born 1993), Spanish footballer
Carles Mundó (born 1976), Spanish politician
Carles Pérez (born 1998), Spanish footballer
Carles Planas (born 1991), Spanish footballer
Carles Puigdemont (born 1962), Spanish politician
Carles Puyol (born 1978), Spanish footballer
Carles Quilmetas (1775–1834), Spanish composer
Carles Rexach (born 1947), Spanish footballer and manager
Carles Riba (1893–1959), Spanish poet, writer and translator
Carles Riera i Albert (born 1960), Spanish sociologist and politician
Carles Sabater (1962–1999), Spanish singer and actor
Carles Sans (born 1975), Spanish water polo
Carles Santos (1940–2017), Spanish artist
Carles Solà (born 1945), Spanish chemical engineer
Carles Soria (born 1996), Spanish footballer
Carles Torrens (born 1984), Spanish director, screenwriter, editor, and producer
Carles Trepat (born 1960), Spanish guitarist

Middle name
Frederick Carles Merry (died 1900), American architect
Jesús Carles de Vilallonga (1927–2018), Spanish artist
Josep Carles Laínez (born 1970), Spanish writer
Ricardo María Carles Gordó (1926–2013), Spanish priest
Sara Carles Johns (1894–1965), American artist and fashion illustrator

Surname
Adele Carles (born 1968), Australian politician
Antonin Carlès (1851–1919), French sculptor
Arthur Beecher Carles (1882–1952), American Modernist painter
Jean Carles (1892–1966), French perfumer
Pierre Carles (born 1962), French documentarist
Richard Fifer Carles (born 1957), Panamanian businessman and politician

See also

Carle, surnames
Carle (given name)
Acosta Carlez
Carles & Sofia Piano Duo
Carlen (surname)
Carley (name)
 Carlos (given name)
 Carlos (surname)
Charles

Notes

Catalan masculine given names